Eucalyptus suffulgens is a small to medium-sized tree that is endemic to Queensland. It has hard ironbark on the trunk and larger branches, smooth bark above, lance-shaped adult leaves, flower buds in groups of seven on the ends of branchlets, white flowers and barrel-shaped fruit.

Description
It has dark grey to black ironbark on the trunk and larger branches, the thinner branches often with smooth bark. Flowering occurs from April to September and the flowers are white.

Taxonomy and naming
Eucalyptus suffulgens was first formally described in 1991 by Ken Hill and Lawrie Johnson in the journal Telopea from specimens collected by Johnson near Biloela in 1971. The specific epithet (suffulgens) is from the Latin sub- meaning "somewhat" and fulgens meaning "shining", referring to the leaves of the species.

Distribution and habitat
This ironbark is locally abundant on shallow soil over sandstone on ranges and escarpments in the central ranges of Queensland, including the Blackdown Tableland.

Conservation stutus
This eucalypt is classified as "least concern" under the Queensland Government Nature Conservation Act 1992.

See also
List of Eucalyptus species

References

Trees of Australia
suffulgens
Myrtales of Australia
Flora of Queensland
Plants described in 1991